Akin is a surname. Notable people with the surname include:

Albert J. Akin (1803–1903), American banker and philanthropist who funded the Akin Free Library
Asım Akin (born 1940), Turkish physician
Bob Akin (born 1936), American sports commentator, executive, and auto racer
Daniel L. Akin (born 1957), American theologian and educator
David Akin, Canadian journalist
Edward C. Akin (1852–1936), American politician
Harold Akin (1945–2022), American football player
Henry Akin (1944–2020),  American basketball player
Ian Akin (born 1959), American comic artist
James H. Akin (1832–1911), American Confederate veteran, farmer and politician
James Akin ( – 1846), American political cartoonist
John Aikin (Unitarian) (1713–1780) English Unitarian scholar and theological tutor
Jon Akin (born 1977), American soccer player
Keegan Akin (born 1995), American baseball player
Len Akin (1916–1987), American National Football League player
Louis Akin (1868–1913), American painter and illustrator
Philip Akin (born 1950), Canadian actor
Susan Akin (born 1965), American beauty pageant titleholder
Theron Akin (1855–1933), U.S. Representative from New York
Todd Akin (born 1947), U.S. Republican politician from Missouri
Warren Akin Sr. (1811–1877), Confederate politician

See also
Aiken (surname)
Aikin
Akins